Autocrates vitalisi is a species of beetle in the Trictenotomidae family. It was described in 1912 by Vulliet.

References

Trictenotomidae
Beetles described in 1912